The Journal of Geology publishes research on geology, geophysics, geochemistry, sedimentology, geomorphology, petrology, plate tectonics, volcanology, structural geology, mineralogy, and planetary sciences. Its content ranges from planetary evolution to computer modeling of fossil development, making it relevant to geologists as well as other researchers working in the Earth or planetary sciences.

It was established in 1893 by Thomas Chrowder Chamberlin.

References

External links
 

English-language journals
Bimonthly journals
University of Chicago Press academic journals
Publications established in 1893
Geology journals